Alive & Well: Recorded in Paris is a (mostly) live album by the jazz rock band Soft Machine, released in 1978.

Overview
As reported on the booklet of the 2010 edition, it was recorded almost entirely live, by The Manor Mobile recording engineer Alan Perkins, during a 4-night residency at Paris' Théâtre Le Palace in July 1977. Much of the album was later mixed and partially re-recorded in studio; the track "Soft Space" was completely re-recorded in studio and released as a single ("Soft Space" parts 1 and 2) in 1978.

Track listing
All songs composed by Karl Jenkins except where indicated.

Side one
"White Kite" – 3:00
"Eos" – 1:22
"Odds Bullets and Blades Pt. I" – 2:18
"Odds Bullets and Blades Pt. II" – 2:33
"Song of the Sunbird" – 1:24
"Puffin" – 1:18
"Huffin" – 5:12
Note: on original LP pressings, the audience noises after the end of "Huffin" continue into the runout groove.

Side two
"Number Three" (John Etheridge) – 2:25
"The Nodder" – 7:13
"Surrounding Silence" (Ric Sanders) – 4:04
"Soft Space" – 8:17

2010 Double-CD issue

CD 1
"White Kite" – 3:00
"Eos" – 1:20
"Odds Bullets and Blades (Part I)" – 2:19
"Odds Bullets and Blades (Part II)" – 2:33
"Song of the Sunbird" – 1:25
"Puffin'" – 1:17
"Huffin'" – 4:42
"Number Three" (John Etheridge) – 2:26
"The Nodder" – 7:12
"Surrounding Silence" (Ric Sanders) – 4:05
"Soft Space" – 8:18

CD 2
(all previously unreleased except tracks 9 & 10)
"K's Riff" – 4:41
"The Nodder" – 7:13
"Two Down" (John Etheridge, John Marshall) – 2:27
"The Spraunce" (Peter Lemer, Steve Cook) – 6:27
"Song of Aeolus" – 3:41
"Sideburn" (John Marshall) – 7:44
"The Tale of Taliesin" – 8:08
"Organic Matter (Alan Wakeman, John Etheridge, John Marshall, Karl Jenkins, Roy Babbington) / One Over the Eight" (Steve Cook) – 5:55
"Soft Space, Part One" (edited version) – 4:15
"Soft Space, Part Two" (disco version) – 5:41

Personnel
Soft Machine
 John Marshall – drums, percussion
 Karl Jenkins – piano, electric keyboards, synthesizer
 John Etheridge – acoustic and electric guitars
 Ric Sanders – violin (credited as Rick Sanders)
 Steve Cook – bass guitar

References

External links 
 Soft Machine - Alive & Well: Recorded in Paris (1978) album review by William Ruhlmann, credits & releases at AllMusic
 Soft Machine - Alive & Well: Recorded in Paris (1978) album releases & credits at Discogs
 Soft Machine - Alive & Well: Recorded in Paris (1978) album credits & user reviews at ProgArchives.com
 Soft Machine - Alive & Well: Recorded in Paris (1978) album to be listened on Spotify
 Soft Machine - Alive & Well: Recorded in Paris (1978) album to be listened on YouTube

Soft Machine albums
1978 live albums
Harvest Records live albums